Rajesh Hamal is a Nepali film actor, singer, model, and television presenter. Hamal used to be one of the highest paid actors in Nepali film throughout the 1990s and 2000s. Hamal debuted as an actor in Deepak Rayamajhi's film Yug Dekhi Yug Samma in 1988. Since then, he has appeared in over 300 Films in a career spanning nearly four decades. He starred in Yug Dekhi Yug Samma (1988), Kasam (1992), Deuta (1991), Ek Number Ko Pakhe (1999), Hami Tin Bhai (2004), Ajambari Naataa (2005) and Mukhauta (2014), among others. He hosts the Nepali version of Who Wants to Be a Millionaire?, titled Ko Bancha Crorepati (2019).

Films

Television

Stage

Music videos

References

External links 

Rajesh Hamal filmography - LensNepal

Male actor filmographies
Nepalese filmographies